Ratkovo is a village and municipality in Martin District in the Žilina Region of northern Slovakia.

History
In historical records the village was first mentioned in 1489.

Geography
The municipality lies at an altitude of 440 metres and covers an area of 0.909 km². It has a population of about 182 people.

External links
http://www.statistics.sk/mosmis/eng/run.html

Villages and municipalities in Martin District